Biała County (Polish: Powiat bialski; German: Bezirk Biała) also known as Biala County (German: Bezirk Biala), was a county of Kingdom of Galicia and Lodomeria, Austria-Hungary that existed between 1867 and 1918. The seat of the county was Biała (now part of Bielsko-Biała, Poland).

In 1879 county had area of 378.44 km2 (146.12 square miles) and had population of 79 610 osób. It had 74 settlements organized into 63 municipalities. There were 3 county courts located in Biała, Kęty and Oświęcim.

On 1 August 1910 part of the county was separated and united with part of Wadowice County in order to form Oświęcim County. Kingdom of Galicia and Lodomeria seeded to exist in 1918 with Biała County being incorporated to Second Republic of Poland where it was reorganized into Biała County, Kraków Voivodeship.

County mayors 
 Władysław Hallauer (1870–1871)
 Jan Hild (1879–1882)
 Eugeniusz Kraus (1890)
 Maciej Biesiadecki (1904–1913)

Government commissioners 
 Jan Sałasz (1870)
 Juliusz Prokopczyc (1871)
 Władysław Chądzyński (1879)
 Karol Schmidt, Franciszek Szałowski (1882)
 Franciszek Szałowski (1890)

County commissioners 
 Edward Stonawski (1917)

References

Bibliography 
 Szematyzm Królestwa Galicyi i Lodomeryi z Wielkiem Księstwem Krakowskiem na rok 1879, Lviv, 1879 (in Polish)

Kingdom of Galicia and Lodomeria